The  2019 Estonian Small Cup is the 10th season of the Estonian amateur football knockout tournament. The tournament began in March 2019, and the final will take place in September 2019 at the A. Le Coq Arena, Tallinn. Saue JK are the current cup holders.

First Round (1/64)
The draw was made by Estonian Football Association on 13 March 2019.
League level of the club in the brackets.
Rahvaliiga RL (people's league) is a league organized by Estonian Football Association, but not part of the main league system.

Byes
These teams were not drawn and secured a place in the second round without playing:
 II Liiga (4): JK Sillamäe Kalev, Lasnamäe FC Ajax, Tartu FC Santos, Tallinna JK Legion II, FC Jõgeva Wolves, Põhja-Tallinna JK Volta II, Tallinna JK Piraaja, FC Kose, Raasiku FC Joker, Viljandi JK Tulevik II, Põhja-Sakala, Pärnu JK Poseidon, Viimsi JK II, FC Flora U19, Raplamaa JK, Paide Linnameeskond III
 III Liiga (5): Türi Ganvix JK, Anija JK, SK Kadrina, FC Sillamäe, Tallinna FC Hell Hunt, Lilleküla JK Retro, Tallinna FC Zenit, Harju JK Laagri, Rumouri Calcio Tallinn, Maarjamäe FC Igiliikur, Tallinna FC Zapoos, FC Tarvastu and Tõrva JK ÜM, Valga FC Warrior, FC Otepää, EMÜ SK, FC Äksi Wolves, SK Illi and Jõgeva SK Noorus-96 ÜM, Tartu JK Tammeka IV, Tartu JK Welco X, JK Kernu Kadakas, Rummu Dünamo, Saarema JK aaMeraaS, Pakri SK Alexela, Saue JK, Kohila Püsivus, Pärnu JK Poseidon II, Märjamaa Kompanii, Pärnu Jalgpalliklubi II
 IV Liiga (6): Tallinna FC Soccernet, Tallinna FC TransferWise, FC Tallinna Wolves, Tallinna FC Eston Villa II, Tallinna FC Reaal, Kristiine JK, Tallinna JK Jalgpallihaigla, Viimsi Lõvid, Põlva FC Lootos
 Rahvaliiga (RL): Rasmus Värki jalgpallikool, Püssi SK, FC Sssolutions, JK Pärnu Sadam, Rumouri Calcio II, FC Maksatransport, FC Teleios, SC ReUnited

Second round (1/32)
The draw was made by Estonian Football Association on 15 March 2019.
League level of the club in the brackets.
Rahvaliiga RL (people's league) is a league organized by Estonian Football Association, but not part of the main league system.

Third round (1/16)
The draw was made by Estonian Football Association on 29 April 2019.
League level of the club in the brackets.
Rahvaliiga RL (people's league) is a league organized by Estonian Football Association, but not part of the main league system.

Fourth round (1/8)
The draw was made by Estonian Football Association on 17 May 2019.
League level of the club in the brackets.
Rahvaliiga RL (people's league) is a league organized by Estonian Football Association, but not part of the main league system.

References

2019
Cup